Rumana Mahmood is a Bangladesh Nationalist Party politician and the former Member of Parliament from Sirajganj-2.

Early life and education
Begum Rumana was born on 30 July 1951, to a Bengali Muslim family known as the Chowdhuries of Natore. She holds a Bachelor of Science degree.  She later married Iqbal Hasan Mahmud Tuku and moved to Sirajganj.

Career
Mahmood was elected to Parliament in 2008 from Sirajganj-2 as a Bangladesh Nationalist Party candidate. She was a member of the Parliamentary Standing Committee on Ministry of Commerce.

References

Bangladesh Nationalist Party politicians
Living people
1951 births
9th Jatiya Sangsad members
20th-century Bengalis
People from Natore District
People from Sirajganj Sadar Upazila